Lorraine Schwartz is an American bespoke high jewellery designer. She has designed jewelleries for a host of famous female celebrities including Beyoncé, Blake Lively and Kim Kardashian. In 2009, Angelina Jolie showed up at the Oscars wearing a pair of emerald earrings designed by Lorraine Schwartz which cost $2.5 million.

Career
Schwartz states that in 2002 Halle Berry wore her jewellery on the red carpet. Since, she has designed for celebrities such as Kelly Rowland, Beyoncé Knowles, Jennifer Lopez and Cate Blanchett.  For ESPN The Magazine, she made a "30-carat, diamond-and-ruby logo" for their 10th anniversary baseball caps. She was also involved in the "Art for Life" gala in 2007, which was led by Russell Simmons and his ex-wife, Kimora Lee Simmons. In the 2006 Beyoncé song, "Upgrade U", Lorraine Schwartz is mentioned. Kim Kardashian wears a 15-carat diamond engagement ring by Schwartz, given to her by her now ex-husband, Kanye West.

Philanthropy
In 2009, she created the Shulamit Benjamini Sandberg Medical Research Grant, which supports a physician with $225,000 to last over three years for cancer research. It was created "in honor of her late mother".

References

American jewelry designers
20th-century American jewellers
American Jews
Year of birth missing (living people)
Living people
Women jewellers